IF Boltic was a Swedish sports club from the town Karlstad. It existed from 1946 to 2000.  In 2000, IF Boltic was merged with IF Göta and formed the new club BS BolticGöta.

IF Boltic was for a number of years the most successful bandy team in Sweden and also one of the best in the world. IF Boltic is to date the only club which has managed to become Swedish champion for both men and women the same year.

After the 2007/08 season the name IF Boltic is used again for the new club, but the formal name of the new club is still BS BolticGöta.

Men's team
IF Boltic was founded in 1946 in Herrhagen in Karlstad. Originally, the club did not only play bandy, but had also sections for handball and association football. The name Boltic was created due to the interest for British football, by adding the beginning of Bolton to the end of Celtic. Together, this makes Boltic.

In the early and mid-1980s IF Boltic dominated Swedish bandy and became Swedish champions eight times from 1979 to 1988, all years except for 1986 and 1987 when they lost the finals against Vetlanda BK and IFK Motala respectively. Another national championship was won in 1995. The team also won the World Cup and the European Cup a number of times.

Honours

Domestic
 Swedish Champions:
 Winners (9): 1979, 1980, 1981, 1982, 1983, 1984, 1985, 1988, 1995
 Runners-up (4): 1986, 1987, 1992, 1993

International
 World Cup:
 Winners (6): 1980, 1981, 1985, 1986, 1995, 1996
 Runners-up (1): 1982
 European Cup:
 Winners (6): 1979, 1981, 1982, 1984, 1985, 1995
 Runners-up (4): 1980, 1983

Women's team
IF Boltic were also successful in women's bandy where they were dominant in the 1980s and reached the final of the women's Swedish masters in nine successive seasons, winning six of them.

Women's honours

References

 
Defunct bandy clubs in Sweden
Sport in Karlstad
Bandy clubs established in 1946
Sports clubs established in 1946
Sports clubs disestablished in 2000
1946 establishments in Sweden
2000 disestablishments in Sweden